Maria Petrou FREng (17 May 1953 – 15 October 2012) was a Greek-born British scientist who specialised in the fields of artificial intelligence and machine vision. She developed a number of novel image recognition techniques, taught at Surrey University and Imperial College London, and was a prolific author of scientific articles.

Early life and education
Petrou was born in Thessaloniki, Greece, in 1953, and displayed an aptitude for science from an early age. She began tutoring children in maths and science at the age of 15. She studied physics at the Aristotle University of Thessaloniki, before travelling to the United Kingdom to study mathematics and astronomy at the University of Cambridge. In 1983, Petrou began working as a postdoctoral research assistant at Oxford University's Department of Theoretical Physics.

Artificial intelligence research
As British academia gained a more practical focus in the 1980s, Petrou began to study machine vision and other aspects of robotic intelligence. In 1988, she started work at the University of Surrey's Department of Electronic and Electrical Engineering, becoming its Professor of Image Analysis in 1998. She later held the Chair of Signal Processing at Imperial College London, and was the Director of the Informatics and Telematics Institute at Greece's Centre for Research and Technology (CERTH) from 2009 until her death. Petrou was furthermore elected a Fellow of the Royal Academy of Engineering, authored several books, and was a prolific contributor to scientific journals.

During her career, Petrou developed a number of important image recognition techniques, including methods for robotic texture analysis, image comparison and 3D measurement. Most notably, she and Dr Alexander Kadyrov co-invented the trace transform, a method of image representation that allows for more efficient facial recognition systems. Technologies based on Petrou's work have had numerous applications in commerce, medicine and environmental imaging. She was also an amateur cartoonist, and once challenged her colleagues to construct a robot capable of ironing clothes – a challenge that later developed into a European Union-funded robotics project.

Personal life
Petrou married Phil L. Palmer, a British astronomer, with whom she had one son before divorcing. She died of cancer in October 2012, aged 59.

References

External links
Imperial College London webpage (last updated 2009)
2006 British Machine Vision Association biography
Guardian obituary

1953 births
2012 deaths
Greek emigrants to England
Scientists from Thessaloniki
Greek computer scientists
Greek women computer scientists
British women computer scientists
British computer scientists
Academics of Imperial College London
Academics of the University of Oxford
Academics of the University of Surrey
Aristotle University of Thessaloniki alumni
Artificial intelligence researchers
Deaths from cancer in Greece
Fellows of the Royal Academy of Engineering
Female Fellows of the Royal Academy of Engineering
Alumni of the University of Cambridge
Fellows of the International Association for Pattern Recognition
20th-century women engineers